The Bell 47 is a single-rotor single-engine light helicopter manufactured by Bell Helicopter. It was based on the third Bell 30 prototype, which was the company's first helicopter designed by Arthur M. Young. The 47 became the first helicopter certified for civilian use on 8 March 1946. The first civilian delivery was made on 31 December 1946 to Helicopter Air Transport. More than 5,600 Bell 47s were produced, including those under license by Agusta in Italy, Kawasaki Heavy Industries in Japan, and Westland Aircraft in the United Kingdom. The Bell 47J Ranger is a modified version with a fully enclosed cabin and tail boom.

Design and development
Early models varied in appearance, with open cockpits or sheet metal cabins, fabric covered or open structures, some with four-wheel landing gear.
Later model D and Korean War H-13D and E types settled on a more utilitarian style. The most common model, the 47G introduced in 1953, can be recognized by the full "soap bubble" canopy, exposed welded-tube tail boom, saddle fuel tanks and skid landing gear.

The later three-seat 47H had an enclosed cabin with full cowling and monocoque tail boom. It was an attempt to market a "luxury" version of the basic 47G. Relatively few were produced.

Engines were Franklin or Lycoming vertically mounted piston engines of 178 to 305 HP (150 to 230 kW). Seating varied from two (early 47s and the later G-5A) to four (the J and KH-4).

In April 2011 there were 1068 registered with the Federal Aviation Administration in the United States and 15 in the United Kingdom.

Bell 47s were produced in Japan by a Bell and Kawasaki venture; this led to the Kawasaki KH-4 variant, a four-seat version of the Model 47 with a cabin similar to the Bell 47J. It differed from the "J" in having a standard uncovered tail boom and fuel tanks like the G series. It was sold throughout Asia, and some were used in Australia.

In February 2010, the Bell 47 type certificates were transferred to Scott's Helicopter Services. The sister company that was formed, Scott's - Bell 47, is in the process of starting production of a turboshaft powered version of the Bell 47, the 47GT-6, using a Rolls-Royce RR300 engine and with composite rotor blades, with deliveries planned from 2016.

Operational history

The Bell 47 entered US military service in late 1946, and operated in a variety of versions and under different designations for three decades. It was designated H-13 Sioux by the US Army, and during the Korean War, it served a variety of roles, including reconnaissance and scouting, search and rescue, and medevac.

The "Telecopter" was a Bell Model 47 rented by television station KTLA in Los Angeles, California.  It was outfitted with a television camera and it made the worlds first flight by a television news helicopter on July 3, 1958, with its inventor, John D. Silva, aboard. When the television station reported it was receiving no video, Silva exited the helicopters cockpit to climb onto its landing skid while it hovered at 1,500 feet (457 m) so he could investigate the microwave transmitter bolted to its side, where he discovered a vacuum tube had failed due to vibration and hot weather. After Silva fixed the problem overnight, the Telecopter made the world's first successful television news flight on July 4, 1958.

The National Aeronautics and Space Administration (NASA) had a number of Bell 47s during the Apollo program, used by astronauts as trainers for the lunar lander. Apollo 17 commander Eugene Cernan had a nearly disastrous crash into the Indian River in Florida in 1971, before his flight to the moon. The 47 has also served as the helicopter of choice for basic helicopter flight instruction in many countries.

Records
21 September 1950, first helicopter to fly over the Alps.
As of 2018, this record still stands.

Variants
 Section source: Complete Encyclopedia

Civilian
47 Pre-production version, powered by a  Franklin piston engine.
47A Improved version of the Bell 47, powered by a  Franklin O-335-1 piston engine.

47B Equivalent to the military YR-13/HTL-1, powered by the  Franklin O-335-1.
47B-3 Agricultural/utility version with open crew positions. Also, offered in a version to the US Postal Service as the Bell Airmailer .
47C
47D First to appear with a molded "soap bubble" canopy.
47D-1 Introduced in 1949, it had an open tubework tail boom reminiscent of the Bell Model 30 and three seats.
47E Powered by a  Franklin 6V4-200-C32 engine.
47F
47G Combines a  Franklin engine with the three-seat configuration of the 47D-1 and introduced the twin saddle-bag fuel tank configuration.
47G-2 Powered by the Lycoming VO-435 engine. Produced under license by Westland Aircraft as the Sioux for the UK military.
47G-2A Powered by a  VO-435.
47G-2A-1 Wider cabin, improved rotor blades and increased fuel capacity.
47G-3 Powered by a supercharged  Franklin 6VS-335-A.
47G-3B Powered by a turbocharged  Lycoming TVO-435.
47G-4 Three-seat helicopter powered by an  Avco Lycoming VO-540 engine.
47G-5 A three-seat utility version. A two-seat agricultural version was later known as the Ag-5. The 47G-5 remained in production even after H & J production had ended.
Bell 47H-1 A three-seat version with an enclosed cabin and fuselage.
47J Ranger A four-seat version powered by a VO-435 engine.
47KMilitary two-seat training variant of the 47J.

Military
 See H-13 Sioux

Licensed versions
Agusta A.115 1971 Italian prototype of a Bell 47J with an unclad, tubular tail boom, and powered by a Turbomeca Astazou II turboshaft engine
Meridionali/Agusta EMA 124 Italian prototype with redesigned forward fuselage. Not produced.

Kawasaki KH-4 Japanese production version with redesigned, lengthened cabin, and redesigned control system

Conversions

Carson Super C-4
El Tomcat Mk.II Bell 47G-2 modified extensively for agricultural spraying by Continental Copters Inc. First flew in April 1959, followed by further improved versions.

Operators

Military operators
For all military operators, regardless of the actual model, see Bell H-13 Sioux operators

Government operators

 Ontario Lands and Forests

 Carabinieri
 Guardia di Finanza
 Vigili del Fuoco 

Los Angeles City Fire Department
Los Angeles Police Department
New York City Police Department

Aircraft on display

Canada
 CF-ODM – Bell 47D-1 on static display at the Canadian Bushplane Heritage Centre in Sault Ste. Marie, Ontario.
 Unknown ID – Bell 47G on static display at the Alberta Aviation Museum in Edmonton, Alberta. It was assembled from parts and represents a Bell 47D.
 CF-NHH – Bell 47G on static display at The Hangar Flight Museum in Calgary, Alberta. It was built by college students from parts and has never flown.
 CF-GWD – Bell 47D-1 on display at the Canadian Museum of History, Gatineau, Quebec.
 CF-FZX – Bell 47G-4 on display at the British Columbia Aviation Museum.
 C-FIVE – Bell 47J-2 on display at the Canadian Museum of Flight, Langley, British Columbia.
Chile
 H-03 (Chilean Air Force) – Bell 47D-1 on static display at the Museo Nacional Aeronáutico y del Espacio in Santiago.
France
 710 (French Air Force) – Bell 47G on static display at the Musée de l’air et de l’espace in Le Bourget, Île-de-France.
Germany
 AS+058 (German Army) – Agusta-Bell 47G-2 on static display at the Deutsches Museum in Munich, Bavaria.
Japan
 JA7008 – Kawasaki-Bell 47D-1 (one of first two aircraft of All Nippon Airways) on static display at ANA Safety Education Center, nearby Haneda Airport. It was once displayed at   until its closure in 2006.
Malta
 AS7201 – Bell 47G-2 on static display at the Malta Aviation Museum in Ta'Qali. It was the first aircraft of the Armed Forces of Malta and was donated to the museum on 31 May 2008.
New Zealand
 NZ3705 – Bell 47G-3B-1 on static display at the Air Force Museum of New Zealand in Wigram, Canterbury.
Norway
 LN-ORW – Bell 47D-1 on static display at the Norwegian Aviation Museum in Bodø, Nordland.
Spain
 HE.7B-31 – AB-47G-3B1 on static display at the Museo Aeronáutico de Málaga in Málaga, Andalusia.
Sweden
 Unknown ID – Bell 47G on static display at the ABBA: The Museum in Stockholm. It had previously been featured on the cover for ABBA's 1976 album Arrival.
Switzerland
 HB-XAE – Bell 47G-2 on static display at the Swiss Museum of Transport in Lucerne.
United Kingdom
 G-AZYB (painted in former SABENA markings as OO-SHW) – Bell 47H on static display at the Helicopter Museum in Weston-super-Mare, Somerset. It supported a scientific expedition in Antarctica.
United States
 N5H – Bell 47B on static display at the American Helicopter Museum & Education Center in West Chester, Pennsylvania.
 N3H – Bell 47 on static display at the Niagara Aerospace Museum in Niagara Falls, New York.
 N116B – Bell 47B on static display at the Steven F. Udvar-Hazy Center of the National Air and Space Museum in Chantilly, Virginia.
 N39KH – Bell 47D on static display at the Hiller Aviation Museum in San Carlos, California.
 LV-AEE – Bell 47B-3 on static display at the Classic Rotors Museum in Ramona, California.
 LV-AEF – Bell 47B-3 on static display at the Niagara Aerospace Museum in Niagara Falls, New York.
 82 – Bell 47D1 on static display at the Tellus Science Museum in Cartersville, Georgia.
 N996B – Bell 47H-1 on static display at the Niagara Aerospace Museum in Niagara Falls, New York.
 N8010E – Bell 47H on static display at the American Helicopter Museum & Education Center in West Chester, Pennsylvania.
 Unknown ID – On static display at the American Helicopter Museum & Education Center in West Chester, Pennsylvania. It is a Bell 47D-1 that has converted to an H-13 and painted in "M*A*S*H"configuration.
 Unknown ID – Bell 47D-1 on static display at the Museum of Modern Art in New York, New York.
 Unknown ID – Bell 47 on static display at the Lawrence D. Bell Aircraft Museum in Mentone, Indiana.

Surviving aircraft

Austria
 OE-XDM – Bell 47 G-3B-1T (a former United States Army TH-13T) airworthy with The Flying Bulls in Salzburg.

United States
 N2490B – Bell 47G-2 airworthy at the EAA AirVenture Museum in Oshkosh, Wisconsin.
 N7576 – Bell 47G-2A airworthy at the Classic Rotors Museum in Ramona, California.
 N6356X – Continental Copters Bell 47G airworthy at the Mid America Flight Museum in Mount Pleasant, Texas.

Specifications (Bell 47G-3B)

Notable appearances in media

See also

References

Notes

Bibliography
 
 

 
 
 Mutza, Wayne.  H-13 Sioux Mini in Action.  Carrollton, TX: Squadron/Signal Publications, 1995.  
McGowen, Stanley S. Helicopters: An Illustrated History of Their Impact. Weapons and warfare series. Santa Barbara, Calif: ABC-CLIO, 2005. 

 pp. 21–26.

United States, Headquarters Department of the Army, Army Concept Team in Vietnam.  Final Report of Essential Load of Scout Helicopters.  Saigon, Vietnam: Army Concept Team in Vietnam, 1966.

External links

 Model 47G Museum site
 Model 47G specs from The International Directory of Civil Aircraft by Gerard Frawley
 Scott's – Bell 47, Inc the current type certificate holder

1940s United States helicopters
1940s United States civil utility aircraft
47
Single-engined piston helicopters
Aircraft first flown in 1945